Battersea South was a parliamentary constituency, originally in the County of London and later in Greater London. It returned one Member of Parliament (MP) to the House of Commons of the UK Parliament (using first-past-the-post voting).

It was created for the 1918 general election, when the former Battersea constituency was divided in two and the Clapham constituency was reduced in size, losing both of its Battersea wards of the four in total.  Battersea South was abolished for the 1983 general election, when the bulk of its territory was reunited with Battersea North to form a new Battersea seat.  The south of its area formed a new Tooting seat.

Boundaries 

1918–1950: The Metropolitan Borough of Battersea wards of Bolingbroke, Broomwood, St John, Shaftesbury, and Winstanley.

1950–1974: The Metropolitan Borough of Battersea wards of Bolingbroke, Broomwood, Lavender, Nightingale, St John, Shaftesbury, Stormont, and Thornton.

1974–1983: The London Borough of Wandsworth wards of Balham, Earlsfield, Fairfield, Nightingale, and Northcote.

The seat was created by the Representation of the People Act 1918.  When seats were redistributed by the Representation of the People Act 1948 the boundaries of the constituency were altered to contain only four wards, and Winstanley ward was transferred to Battersea North. However the wards of the borough were redrawn in 1949 prior to the next general election in 1950. Accordingly, changes were made under the House of Commons (Redistribution of Seats) Act 1949. Of the 16 new wards, eight were included in each of the Battersea North and South constituencies.

In 1965 Battersea became part of the London Borough of Wandsworth. This, however made no immediate change to the parliamentary constituencies. It was not until the general election of February 1974 that the constituency boundaries were altered. The Shaftesbury and St John's wards were transferred to Battersea North, while the redrawn constituency incorporated areas previously in the Clapham and Putney seats. These boundaries were used until abolition.

The constituency was abolished in 1983. Most of its area (Balham, Fairfield and Northcote wards) went to the recreated Battersea seat, with part (Earlsfield and Nightingale wards) passing to Tooting.

Members of Parliament

Election results

Elections in the 1970s

Elections in the 1960s

Elections in the 1950s

Election in the 1940s

Election in the 1930s

Election in the 1920s

Election in the 1910s

 Jenkin was supported by and possibly the nominee of the local National Federation of Discharged and Demobilized Sailors and Soldiers branch.

References 

Parliamentary constituencies in London (historic)
Constituencies of the Parliament of the United Kingdom established in 1918
Politics of the London Borough of Wandsworth
History of the London Borough of Wandsworth
Constituencies of the Parliament of the United Kingdom disestablished in 1983
Battersea